Cephalopod intelligence is a measure of the cognitive ability of the cephalopod class of molluscs.

Intelligence is generally defined as the process of  acquiring, storing, retrieving, combining, comparing, and recontextualizing information and conceptual skills. Though these criteria are difficult to measure in nonhuman animals, cephalopods seem to be exceptionally intelligent invertebrates. The study of cephalopod intelligence also has an important comparative aspect in the broader understanding of animal cognition because it relies on a nervous system fundamentally different from that of vertebrates. In particular, the Coleoidea subclass (cuttlefish, squid, and octopuses) is thought to be the most intelligent invertebrates and an important example of advanced cognitive evolution in animals, though nautilus intelligence is also a subject of growing interest among zoologists.

The scope of cephalopod intelligence and learning capability is controversial within the biological community, complicated by the inherent complexity of quantifying non-vertebrate intelligence. In spite of this, the existence of impressive spatial learning capacity, navigational abilities, and predatory techniques in cephalopods is widely acknowledged.

Brain size and structure 
Cephalopods have large, well-developed brains, and their brain-to-body mass ratio is the largest among the invertebrates, falling between that of endothermic and ectothermic vertebrates.

The nervous system of cephalopods is the most complex of all invertebrates. The giant nerve fibers of the cephalopod mantle have been widely used for many years as experimental material in neurophysiology; their large diameter (due to lack of myelination) makes them relatively easy to study compared with other animals.

Behavior

Predation 

Unlike most other molluscs, all cephalopods are active predators (with the possible exceptions of the bigfin squid and vampire squid). Their need to locate and capture their prey has likely been the driving evolutionary force behind the development of their intelligence.

Crabs, the staple food source of most octopus species, present significant challenges with their powerful pincers and their potential to exhaust the cephalopod's respiration system from a prolonged pursuit. In the face of these challenges, octopuses will instead seek out lobster traps and steal the bait inside. They are also known to climb aboard fishing boats and hide in the containers that hold dead or dying crabs.

Captive cephalopods have also been known to climb out of their tanks, maneuver a distance of the lab floor, enter another aquarium to feed on the crabs, and return to their own aquariums.

Communication 
Although believed to not be the most social of animals, many cephalopods are in fact highly social creatures; when isolated from their own kind, some species have been observed shoaling with fish.

Cephalopods are able to communicate visually using a diverse range of signals. To produce these signals, cephalopods can vary four types of communication elements: chromatic (skin coloration), skin texture (e.g. rough or smooth), posture, and locomotion. Changes in body appearance such as these are sometimes called polyphenism. Some cephalopods are capable of rapid changes in skin colour and pattern through nervous control of chromatophores. This ability almost certainly evolved primarily for camouflage, but squid use color, patterns, and flashing to communicate with each other in various courtship rituals. Caribbean reef squid can even discriminate between recipients, sending one message using color patterns to a squid on their right, while they send another message to a squid on their left.

The Humboldt squid shows extraordinary cooperation and communication in its hunting techniques. This is the first observation of cooperative hunting in invertebrates.

It is believed that squids are slightly less intelligent than octopuses and cuttlefish; however, various species of squid are much more social and display greater social communications, etc., leading to some researchers concluding that squids are on par with dogs in terms of intelligence.

Learning 

In laboratory experiments, octopuses can be readily trained to distinguish between different shapes and patterns, and one study concluded that octopuses are capable of using observational learning; however, this is disputed.

Octopuses have also been observed in what has been described as play: repeatedly releasing bottles or toys into a circular current in their aquariums and then catching them.

Cephalopods can demonstrably benefit from environmental enrichment indicating behavioral and neuronal plasticity not exhibited by many other invertebrates.

In a study on social learning, common octopuses (observers) were allowed to watch other octopuses (demonstrators) select one of two objects that differed only in color. Subsequently, the observers consistently selected the same object as did the demonstrators.

Both octopuses and nautiluses are capable of vertebrate-like spatial learning.

Tool use 
The octopus has repeatedly been shown to exhibit flexibility in the use of tools.

At least four individuals of the veined octopus (Amphioctopus marginatus) have been observed retrieving discarded coconut shells, manipulating them, transporting them some distance, and then reassembling them for use as shelter. It is surmised that the octopuses used bivalves for the same purpose before humans made coconut shells widely available on the sea floor. Other sea creatures construct homes in a similar manner; most hermit crabs use the discarded shells of other species for habitation, and some crabs place sea anemones on their carapaces to serve as camouflage. However, this behavior lacks the complexity of the octopus's fortress behavior, which involves picking up and carrying a tool for later use. (This argument remains contested by a number of biologists, who claim that the shells actually provide protection from bottom-dwelling predators in transport.) Octopuses have also been known to deliberately place stones, shells, and even bits of broken bottles to form walls that constrict their den openings.

In laboratory studies, Octopus mercatoris, a small pygmy species of octopus, has been observed to block its lair using plastic Lego bricks.

Smaller individuals of the common blanket octopus (Tremoctopus violaceus) hold the tentacles of the Portuguese man o' war (whose venom they are immune to), both as means of protection and as a method of capturing prey.

Problem-solving ability 
The highly sensitive suction cups and prehensile arms of octopuses, squid, and cuttlefish allow them to hold and manipulate objects. However, unlike vertebrates, the motor skills of octopuses do not seem to depend upon mapping their body within their brains, as the ability to organize complex movements is not thought to be linked to particular arms.

Cephalopods can solve complex puzzles requiring pushing or pulling actions, and can also unscrew the lids of containers and open the latches on acrylic boxes in order to obtain the food inside. They can also remember solutions to puzzles and learn to solve the same puzzle presented in different configurations.

Captive octopuses require stimulation or they will become lethargic; this typically takes the form of a variety of toys and puzzles. At an aquarium in Coburg, Germany, an octopus named Otto was known to juggle his fellow tank-mates around, as well as throw rocks to smash the aquarium glass. On more than one occasion, Otto even caused short circuits by crawling out of his tank and shooting a jet of water at the overhead lamp.

Additionally, cephalopods have been shown to have the capacity for future planning and reward processing after being tested with the Stanford marshmallow experiment.

Protective legislation 

Due to their intelligence, cephalopods are commonly protected by animal testing regulations that do not usually apply to invertebrates.

In the UK from 1993 to 2012, the common octopus (Octopus vulgaris) was the only invertebrate protected under the Animals (Scientific Procedures) Act 1986.

Cephalopods are the only invertebrates protected under the 2010 European Union directive "on the protection of animals used for scientific purposes".

In 2019, some scholars have argued for increased protections for cephalopods in the United States as well.

See also 

Animal cognition
Animal consciousness

References

Further reading 

 So you think you're smarter than a cephalopod? by Wendy Williams, At the Smithsonian's Ocean Portal.
 What behavior can we expect of octopuses? by Dr. Jennifer Mather, Department of Psychology and Neuroscience, University of Lethbridge and Roland C. Anderson, The Seattle Aquarium.
 Is the octopus really the invertebrate intellect of the sea? by Doug Stewart. In: National Wildlife. Feb/Mar 1997, vol.35 no.2.
 Giant Octopus – Mighty but Secretive Denizen of the Deep from the National Zoo in Washington D.C.
 Living Fossils Have Long- And Short-term Memory Despite Lacking Brain Structures Of Modern Cephalopods
 
 Octopuses are Smart Suckers!? By Dr. Jennifer Mather, Department of Psychology and Neuroscience, University of Lethbridge and Roland C. Anderson, The Seattle Aquarium
 
 The Diversity and Evolution of Invertebrate Nervous Systems Set Institute. Retrieved 12 December 2014.
 
 
 
 
 

Animal intelligence
Intelligence